All the Best is a greatest hits album by American singer Tina Turner, released on November 1, 2004, by Parlophone. In the United States, it was released on February 1, 2005, by Capitol Records, followed by an abridged single-disc version titled All the Best: The Hits on October 4, 2005.

Overview
The track listing concentrates on Turner's solo singles, but also features a few highlights from her partnership with Ike Turner. It also contains three new recordings ("Open Arms", "Complicated Disaster" and "Something Special") and some rarer tracks, including duets and her song from the Brother Bear soundtrack, "Great Spirits".

The album peaked at number six on the UK Albums Chart, selling nearly 45,000 copies in its first week, and at number two on the Billboard 200, selling 121,000 copies in its first week, becoming Turner's highest debut in the United States. The album was certified platinum in the U.S. three months after its release. In March 2007, the album re-entered the UK chart at number 18. It has since been certified platinum in various countries.

Track listing

All the Best

All the Best: The Hits

Charts

Weekly charts

Year-end charts

Certifications and sales

References

2005 greatest hits albums
Capitol Records compilation albums
Parlophone compilation albums
Tina Turner compilation albums